Adun Muensamaan (born 17 November 1981) is a professional footballer from Thailand. He currently plays for Songkhla in the Thai League 3. 

Adun was born in Satun Province and previously played for TOT, Police United and Chula United.

Honours

Club
PT Prachuap FC
 Thai League Cup (1) : 2019

References

External links
 Goal.com 
 Players Profile - info.thscore.com
 

1981 births
Living people
Adun Muensamaan
Adun Muensamaan
Association football fullbacks
Adun Muensamaan
Adun Muensamaan
Adun Muensamaan
Adun Muensamaan
Adun Muensamaan